Tennis Borussia Berlin is a German football club based in the locality of Westend in Berlin.

History 
The team was founded in 1902 as Berliner Tennis- und Ping-Pong-Gesellschaft Borussia taking its name from its origins as a tennis and table tennis club. Borussia is a Latinised version of Prussia and was a widely used name for sports clubs in the former state of Prussia. In 1903 the club took up football and quickly developed a rivalry with Berlin's leading side Hertha BSC. In 1913 the club changed its name to Berliner Tennis Club Borussia. They won their first city league championship in 1932 in the Oberliga Berlin-Brandenburg and repeated the feat in 1941, this time by defeating Hertha (8–2) in the Gauliga Berlin-Brandenburg.

Allied authorities ordered the dissolution of all organizations in Germany after World War II. This included football clubs. TeBe played as SG Charlottenburg in the first season after the war. The club was able to use its name Berliner Tennis-Club Borussia again from the 1948-49 season. After World War II and into the early 1950s, TeBe emerged as Berlin's top side but were unable to keep up their form and earn selection to the Germany's new professional league, the Bundesliga, formed in 1963. The team played in tier II leagues throughout the 60s and 70s with the exception of two short-lived forays into the Bundesliga in 1974–75 and 1976–77. Most of the 1980s were spent playing in the third tier Oberliga Berlin.

Through most of its history TeBe has been afflicted by financial problems but has always managed to hang on while many other of Berlin's clubs folded or disappeared in mergers. In 1997–98, a deep-pocketed sponsor brought expensive new talent to the team as they made a run at a return to 2. Bundesliga, which they achieved, winning the Regionalliga Nordost. While initially successful, the bid collapsed in 2000 as the team's finances failed. They were refused a license and were forcibly relegated to the Regionalliga Nord (III) where they finished last in 2000–01 and so slipped further still to the NOFV-Oberliga Nord (IV) the following season.

Finally, in 2000, the club had adopted its current name "Tennis Borussia Berlin", as the club had always been known under this moniker and to avoid being mistaken as a tennis club. It continued playing in the fourth tier – fifth after the introduction of the 3. Liga in 2008 – until 2009, when they won the Oberliga championship and gained promotion again to the Regionalliga Nord. After running into financial difficulties once again, the club went into administration and dropped back down to the NOFV-Oberliga Nord (V) for the 2010–11 season. Seen as one of the pre-season favourites for a second successive relegation, they managed to reach the relegation playoffs at the end of the campaign, but finally lost out 3–1 to SC Borea Dresden over two legs to be relegated to the sixth tier of the German football league system, the Berlin-Liga, for the first time in their history.

Supporters 
The fan movement started in the 1980s when TeBe began having its biggest successes. Despite their fall down the leagues the club still enjoys a relatively strong support. The fans consider themselves fiercely Far-Left, and frequently the fans cultivate the club's Jewish traditions as well as actions against antisemitism, racism and homophobia.

Current squad

League positions since 1963–64

Notable players 
Past (and present) players who are the subjects of Wikipedia articles can be found here.

Managers

Honours 
 Regionalliga Berlin (II):
 Champions 1965, 1974
 2. Bundesliga Nord (II):
 Champions 1976
 Amateur-Oberliga Berlin (III):
 Champions 1982, 1985, 1991
 Regionalliga Nordost (III):
 Champions 1996, 1998
 NOFV-Oberliga Nord (III/V):
 Champions 1993, 2009, 2020
 Berlin-Liga (VI):
 Champions 2015
 Brandenburg football championship:
 Winners 1932
 Oberliga Berlin:
 Champions 1947, 1950, 1951, 1952, 1958
 German amateur football championship:
 Winners 1998
 Berliner Landespokal: (Tiers III-VII) (Record)
 Winners 1931, 1949, 1951, 1964, 1965, 1973, 1985, 1993, 1995, 1996, 1998, 2000, 2002, 2005, 2006, 2008
 Runners-up 1943, 1944, 1950, 1960, 1966, (1969), 1970, 1983, 1987, 2003, 2009, 2019

Women's football

References

External links 
 

 
Association football clubs established in 1902
Sports clubs established in 1902
1902 establishments in Germany
Football clubs in Germany
Tennis Borussia
Table tennis clubs in Germany
Tennis in Germany